A great number of words of French origin have entered the English language to the extent that many Latin words have come to the English language.

A

abaisse
abandon
abandonment
abase (Old Fr. )
abash (Old Fr. )
abate (Old Fr. , compare modern Fr. )
abatement (Old Fr. , compare modern Fr. )
abatis

abattoir
abbatial
abbe
abbess
abbey (Anglo Fr. , from Old Fr. , compare modern Fr. )
abbreviation, (Fr. )
abdication
abet (Old Fr. )
abeyance (Anglo Fr. , from Old Fr. )
abhor (Fr. )
ability (Old Fr. , compare modern Fr.  with restoration of initial h of Latin )
abject
abjection
abjuration
abjure (Fr. )
ablation (Fr. )
ablative
able, from Old French, compare modern Fr.  or 
ablution
abnormal compare 
aboard (Middle Fr. )
abolish, compare 
abolition
abominable
abomination
abound
abrasion
abrasive, Fr. , (fem.)
abridge, Fr. 
abrogation
abrupt
absence
absent
absinthe
absolute, from Middle French, compare modern Fr. 
absolution
absorb (Fr. )
abstain (Old Fr. )
abstention
abstinence
abstinent
absurd
absurdity (Fr. )
abundance (Old Fr. , modern Fr. )
abundant
abuse (Fr. )
abusive (Fr. (fem.) )
abut (Old Fr. )
abysmal (Old Fr. )
academy, compare , from anc. Greek 
Acadia (Fr. )
acceleration (Fr. )
accent (Fr. )
accept (Fr. )
acceptable
acceptance
access (Fr. )
accessible
accession
accident
acclamation
acclimate (Fr. )
accolade
accommodation
accompaniment (Fr. )
accompany (Old Fr. , modern Fr. )
accomplice (Old Fr. )
accomplish (Old Fr. , modern Fr. )
accord
accordance (Old Fr. )
accost
accoucheur
account (Old Fr. )
accountant (Old Fr. )
accoutre or accouter
accoutrements
accredit
accreditation
accrue
accumulation
accusation
accusative (Old Fr. )
accuse
accustom (Old Fr. , modern Fr. )
ace, (Old Fr. )
acephalous, (Fr. )
acerbity, (Middle Fr. )
acetic, (Fr. )
acetylene, (Fr. )
achieve, (Old Fr. )
achievement, (Fr. )
acid, (Fr. )
aconite, (Fr. )
acoustic, (Fr. )
acquaint, (Old Fr. )
acquaintance, (Old Fr. )
acquiesce, (Middle Fr. )
acquiescence, (Middle Fr. )
acquire, (Old Fr. )
acquisition
acquit (Old Fr. )
acrimonious (Fr. )
acrimony (Fr. )
acrobat (Fr. )
acrobatic (Fr. )
acromegaly (Fr. )
across (Anglo Fr. )
act (Old Fr. )
action
activity, (Middle French )
actual, (Old French )
acuity, (Middle French )
adage
adapt, (Middle French )
adaptation
addition
address
adhere
adherence
adhesion
adhesive, compare  or feminine form 
adieu, which literally means "to God", farewell
adjective, compare 
adjoin
adjourn (Old French )
adjudge (Old French , compare modern French )
adjust (Old French , compare modern French )
administer (Old French , compare modern French )
administration
admirable
admiral (Old French )
admiration
admire
admissible
admission
admonish (Old French , compare modern French )
admonition
adolescence
adolescent
adopt
adoption
adorable
adoration
adore
adorn (Old French )
adornment (Old French )
adroit
adulation
advance (Old French )
advancement (Old French )
advantage (Old French )
advantageous
adventure, (Old French , compare modern Fr. )
adventurous, (Old French , compare modern Fr. )
adversary, (Anglo French , from Old Fr. , compare modern Fr. )
adverse (Old French , compare modern Fr. )
adversity (Anglo French , from Old Fr. , compare modern Fr. )
advertisement, (French  [warning])
advice, (Old French  [opinion])
advise, (Old French  [give one's opinion])
advocacy, (Old French )
advocate (Old French  [attorney or lawyer])
aerobic (French )
aerodynamics (French )
aeronautics (French )
aeroplane (French )
affability (French )
affable
affection
affiance (Old French )
affiliation
affinity, (Old French , compare modern Fr. )
affirm, (Old French , compare modern Fr. )
affirmation
affirmative
affix (Middle French , from Old Fr. , compare modern Fr. )
afflict
affliction
affluence
affluent
affront
afraid p.p. of afray (Anglo French , from Old Fr. , compare modern Fr. )
agate
age
agent provocateur
aggrandisement Fr. 
aggravation
aggression, compare 
aggrieve, (Old Fr. , compare modern Fr. )
agile
agility
à gogo, or a-go-go, in abundance
agrarian
agree (Old Fr. , compare modern Fr.  ["to accept" or "to please"])
agreeable, compare modern Fr. 
agreeance (Old Fr. )
agreement (Old Fr. , compare modern Fr.  [authorization or amenity])
agronomy
ague
aid (Old Fr. )
aide-de-camp
aide-mémoire
aileron
aim (Old Fr. )
air
aisle
à la, in the style of...
alabaster, from Old French  (>Latin> Greek> Ancient Egyptian )
à la carte
à la mode
alamode
alarm
alas, from Old French phrase , compare modern Fr. 
alchemist
alchemy
alcove
alembic Middle Fr. , from Arabic 
alert
algorithm
alien (Old Fr. )
alienation (Middle Fr. )
align, (Middle Fr. )
alignment, (French )
allegation
allege
allegiance (Anglo French , from Old Fr. , compare modern Fr. )
allegorical
allegory
allemande
alley compare 
alliance
allocation
allot (Old Fr. )
allotment Fr. 
allow (Old Fr. )
allowable (Old Fr. )
allowance (Old Fr. )
alloy (Anglo Fr. , from Old Fr. )
allude
allure
ally (Old Fr. )
almond, (Old Fr. , compare modern Fr. )
almoner (Old Fr. , compare modern Fr. )
alter
alteration
altruism
altruistic
alum
amass
amateur
ambassador
amber
ambergris
ambiance
ambience
ambiguity
ambiguous
ambition
amble (Old Fr. )
ambulance
ambuscade
ambush (Old Fr. )
amelioration
amenable
amend
amendment
amends
amenity
amerce
amethyst
ami
amiable
amity
ammonite
ammunition, from 
amnesty, compare 
amorous, from Old French, compare modern Fr. 
amortise
amount
amour
amour-propre
ampere
ample
amplify
amplitude
ampoule
ampul
amulet (Middle Fr. )
amuse
amusement
anagram
analogue
analyse
analyst
anatomy
ancestor (Old Fr. , compare modern Fr. )
ancestral
ancestry
ancien regime
ancient
andiron (Old Fr. )
andouille
anecdote
angel (Old Fr. )
angelic
angle
anguish (from Old French , now )
anime Fr. 
animosity
anise (Old Fr. )
anisette
annals (Old Fr. )
annelid
annex, (Old Fr. )
annihilation
announce
announcement
annoy, from Old French , modern Fr. 
annoyance
annual (Old Fr. )
annuity (Old Fr. )
annul (Old Fr. )
annunciation (Fr. )
anoint (Old Fr.
anomy
anonym (Fr. )
antecedent, compare 
antechamber, compare 
antelope, (Old Fr. , compare modern Fr. )
anther, compare 
antibiotic, Fr. 
antigen, Fr. 
antique
antiquity (Old Fr. , compare modern Fr. )
antler (Anglo-Fr. , from Old Fr. , modern Fr. )
anus (Old Fr. )
apart (Old Fr. )
apartment, Fr. 
apathy
apercu, Fr. 
aperitif, Fr. 
aphorism
aplomb
apologetic
apologist
apologue
apoplectic
aporetic
apostille
apostle (Old Fr. , compare modern Fr. )
apostrophe
apothecary (Old Fr. , compare modern Fr. )
appall (Old Fr. , compare modern Fr. )
appanage (Old Fr. )
apparel, (Old Fr. , compare modern Fr. )
apparent
apparition
appeal
appear
appearance
appease
appeasement
appellant
appellation
appellee
apperception
appertain
appetence
appetite
application
applique
apply (Old Fr. , compare modern Fr.  [to implement])
appoint
appointee
appointment
apportion
appose
appraise
appreciable
appreciation
apprehend
apprise
approach
approbation
appropre
approvance
approve
appurtenance
appurtenant
apricot (Fr. , from Port. , from Arabic )
apron (Old Fr. )
après-ski
apropos (Fr. )
aquarelle
aquatic
aqueous
arabesque
arable
arachnid
arbalest
arbitrage
arbitration
arbitrator
arbiter
arbor
arbour
arc
arcade
arch
archaic
archduke
archeology
archer
archery
archetype
architect
architecture
archives
arctic
ardent
ardour
are
arête
argent (Fr. )
argot
argue, (Old French )
argument
argumentation
aridity
aristocracy
aristocrat
aristocratic
arithmetic
arm [weapon] (Old French )
armagnac
armament
armature
armistice
armoire
armorer
armour
army
aromatherapy
aromatic
arraign
arraignment
arrange
arrangement
arras
array
arrearage
arrears
arrest, from Old Fr. 
arrive
arriviste
arrogance
arrogant
arrondissement
arsenal
arsenic
arson
art
art brut
art deco
art nouveau
arterial
artery
artesian
article
articulation
artifice
artificial
artillery
artisan
artist
artiste
artistic
asbestos (Old Fr. )
ascendant
ascertain
ascribe (Old Fr. )
ashlar (Old Fr. )
asine
askance (Old Fr. )
asp (Middle Fr. , modern Fr. )
asperity
aspic
aspirant
aspire
assail
assailant
assassin (Fr. , from Arabic  [hashish users])
assault
assay
assemblage
assemble
assembly
assent
assertion
assess (Anglo Fr. )
assessor (Old Fr. , compare modern Fr. )
assets (Anglo Fr. , from Old Fr. )
assign
assignation
assignee
assignment
assist
assistance
assistant
assize
assonance
assort
assuage
assume
assurance
assure
astonish
astray
astrolabe
astronomy
atavism
atelier
atheism
atheist
attach
attaché
attachment
attack
attain
attainder
attainment
attempt
attend
attendance
attendant
attentive
attest
attestation
attire
attitude
attorn
attorney (Old Fr.  [appointed] p.p. of )
attraction
attractive
attribution
aubade
aubain
aubergine
auburn
au courant
audible
audience
audition
auditor
au fait
augment
augmentation
augmentative
au naturel
au pair
aunt (Anglo Fr. , from Old Fr. , compare modern Fr. )
aureole
auspices
austerity
auteur
authentic
author (Old Fr. , compare modern Fr. )
authorise
authority
autoclave
autocracy
autocrat
autocratic
automobile
autumn
avail
avalanche
avant
avant-garde
avarice
avaricious
avaunt
avenge
avenue
aver
average
averment
avert
aviation (Fr. )
aviator
avid (Fr. )
avidity
avocet
avoid (Old Fr. )
avoirdupois
avouch
avow (Old Fr. )
await (Anglo Fr. , from Old Fr. )
award (Anglo Fr. , from Old Fr. )
axiom (Fr. )
aye-aye
azimuth (Old Fr. , from Arabic )
azure (Old Fr. , from Arabic , from Persian )

B

baba au rhum
baboon (Fr. )
babouche (Fr. , from Arabic , from Persian )
baccarat
bachelor (Old Fr. )
bacon (Old Fr. )
bacteriophage (Fr. )
badinage
bagatelle
baggage, (Old Fr. )
baguette (Fr. , from Italian ) 
bail (Old Fr. )
bailey
bailiff
baize
balance
baldric  (Old Fr. , compare modern Fr. )
bale (Old Fr. , from Germanic)
baleen
ball [dancing party] (Old Fr. )
ballad (Fr. , from Old Provençal )
ballet (Fr. , from Italian )
ballon
balloon (Fr. )
balm (Old Fr. , compare modern Fr. )
baluster (Fr. , from Italian )
balustrade (Fr. , from Italian )
banal
banality
band, (Middle Fr. )
bandage
bandeau
bandolier
bandy
banish (Old Fr. , from Frankish )
bank (Old Fr. , from Old Italian , from Germanic)
banner
banquet
banquette
baptise (Old Fr. )
bar (Old Fr. )
barb (Old Fr. )
bargain (Old Fr. )
barge
bark [small ship] (Middle Fr. )
baron (Old Fr. , from Frankish )
baroness
baroque
barque
barracks
barrage
barratry
barre
barrel (Old Fr. )
barren, (Old Fr. )
barret
barrette
barricade
barrier
barter (Old Fr. )
base
basil
basin
basket
bas-relief
basset (hound)
bassinet
bassoon
bastard
baste [sew] (Old Fr. )
bastion
bate (Old Fr. , compare modern Fr. )
bathyscaphe
baton
battalion (Middle Fr. , from Italian )
batten (Fr. )
batter
battery
battle (Old Fr. )
battlement
bauble
baud
bauxite
bay, compare 
bayonet, compare 
beagle (Fr. )
beak, (Old Fr. )
Béarnaise, a type of sauce, named after a region in France (Béarn)
beast (Old Fr. , compare modern Fr. )
beatification
beatitude
beau, a lover or a dandy
beau idéal
beau monde
beauty (Old Fr. )
beaux arts, fine arts
bec de corbin
bechamel
beef (Old Fr. , compare modern Fr. )
beef bourguignon
beggar (Old Fr. )
begonia
beige
beignet
beldame
belfry
belle
belles-lettres
benefice (Fr. )
beneficial
benefit (Anglo-Fr. , compare modern Fr. )
benevolent
benign
benignity
benison
benzoin
berate
berceuse
beret, compare 
bergamot
berline
berm (Fr. , from Old Dutch )
beryl (Old Fr. , from anc. Greek , from Sanskrit )
bestial
bête noire
betray
bevel
beverage (Anglo-Fr. , from Old Fr.  [to drink], compare modern Fr. )
bevy
bezant
bezel
bezique
bias
bibelot
bibliophile
bice (short form of Fr.  [brownish-grey blue])
bicycle, compare  > 
bidet
bigamy
bigot
bigotry
bijou
bikini
bile
bilge
biliary
bilious
billet
billet-doux, a love letter
billiards Fr. , dim. of Old Fr.  [stick of wood], from Gaulish  [tree]
billion
binocular
biopsy
biscuit
bison
bisque
bistro
bittern
bituminous
bivouac
bizarre
blame
blanch
blancmange
blandish
blank (Old Fr. )
blanket, from Old French  (originally "a white cloth")
blasé
blaspheme
blasphemy
blazon
blemish
bleu cheese
blister
bloc
block
blond
blonde
blouse
bludgeon
blue Old Fr. , from Frankish 
bobbin
boil (Old Fr. )
Boise
boisterous
bomb
bombard (Fr. "bombarde")
bombardier
bombast
bombazine
bombe
bon appétit
bonbon
bonhomie
bon mot
bonnet, from Old French, compare modern Fr. 
bonny
bon ton
bon viveur the French use  instead
bon voyage
boot
booty
borage
borax
Bordeaux wine
bordello
border
botanic
botany
bottle
bouche
boudoir
bouffant
bougainvillea
bougie
bouillabaisse
bouillon
boule
boulevard
boulevardier
bound (v.) Old Fr. 
bound (n.) Old Fr. 
boundary
bounty
bouquet
bourbon whiskey
bourdon
bourgeois
bourgeoisie
bourn
bourse
boutique
boutonniere
bowel
bowls
brace
bracelet
brach
bracket
braggart
brail
Braille
braise
bran, from Old French  or 
branch
brandish, compare 
brasserie
brassiere, compare , although the modern French for this is 
brave
bravery
brawn
bray
braze
brazier
bream
brevet
bribe
bric-a-brac
brick
bricolage
Brie cheese
brigade
brigadier
brigand
brigantine
brilliant, compare 
brioche
briquette
Britain Old Fr. , from Latin 
Briton Anglo-Fr. , from Latin 
Brittany Old Fr. , from Latin 
broach
brochure, Fr. , from  - to stitch
broderie anglaise, a type of embroidery
broil
broker
bromine
bronze
brooch
brose
brouhaha
browse
Bruce (Norman name)
bruise Old Fr. 
bruit
brulee
brume
brunet
brunette
brush
brusque
brut
brute
buccaneer Fr. 
bucket
buckle, compare 
buckler
buckram
budge
budget, from Old Fr.  (a little purse)
buff
buffer
buffet
buffoon
bugle
bulb
bulge
bulletin
bullion
bun
burden compare 
bureau
bureaucracy
bureaucrat
burette
burgeon
burgess
burglar
Burgundy wine, Old Fr. , now 
burin
burlesque
burnish
bushel
busk
busker
buskin
bustard
bustier
butcher
butchery
butler
butt
butte
buttery
button, Old Fr. , compare modern Fr. 
buttress
buzzard

C

cabal, compare 
cabaret
cabbage, Middle Fr.  "head"
cabernet
cabin
cabinet
cable
cabochon
cabotage
cabriolet
cache, compare 
cache-sexe
cachet
cadastral
caddie Scottish, from Fr. 
cadence
cadet
Cadillac, named for Antoine de la Mothe Cadillac
cadre
café
café au lait
cafetière
cage
cagoule
cahier
cahoots
caisson
caitiff
cajole, compare 
cajolery
Cajun
calaboose
calamine
calamitous
calamity
calcify
calendar Old Fr. , compare modern Fr. 
calender
calibre
caliph Fr. , from Arabic 
caliphate
calligraphy Fr. , from Greek  "beautiful" +  "to write"
calm
calmative
calomel
caloric
calorie
calque
calumet
calumny
Calvinism
camaraderie
camber
camel
camembert
camisole Fr. , from Provençal 
camomile
camouflage
camp
campaign, compare 
camphor
cancan
canaille
canal
canapé
canard
canary
cancel, Anglo-Fr.
candy
cane
cannon
cannonade
canon [clergyman], Anglo-Fr. , from Old N. Fr.  (compare Fr. )
canonise, Old Fr. 
canteen
cantle
canton
cantonment
canvas
capable
capacity
cap-a-pie
caparison
cape
capillarity
capitalism
capitalist
capitulation
capon Old N. Fr. , compare modern Fr. 
capote
caprice
capricious
capsid
capstan Old Fr. , from Old Provençal 
capsule
captain Old Fr. 
caption
captious
capture
Capuchin
car Old N. Fr. , from Latin , from Gaulish 
carabineer
carafe
caramel
carapace
carat
caravan
caravel
carbine
carbon
carbonate
carbuncle
carcass
card (Fr. )
cardiac
careen
career (Fr. )
caress
caribou
caricature
carillon
carious
carmine
carnage
carnation
carnival
carnivore
carob, Fr. , from Arabic 
carol
carom
carouse
carousel
carp
carpel
carpenter
carpentry
carpet
carrack
carrefour
carriage
carrion
carrot
carry, Old N. Fr. , (compare Fr. )
carte blanche
carte de visite
cartel
carter
Cartesian
cartilage
cartography
carton
cartouche
cartridge
caryatid
cascade
case
casein
casement
cash, Middle Fr. 
cashew
cashier
cask
casque
casserole
cassette
cassis
cassock
castle, Old North Fr. , Old Fr. , compare modern Fr. 
castor
casual (Old Fr. )
casuist, compare 
cataclysm
catafalque
catalogue
catapult
catch
catchpoll
catechumen
category
caterpillar
catheter
catholic
cattle
caudle
caul
cauldron
caulk
causative
cause
caustic
cauterize
caution
cavalcade
cavalier
cavalry, compare 
cave
cavern
caviar
cavil
cavity
cease Old Fr. 
cedar Old Fr. 
celadon
celebrant
celebration
celebrity
celerity
celery
celestial
celibate
cellar
cellulite
cellulose
Celtic
cement (Old Fr. )
cemetery
cenacle
cenotaph
cense, compare 
censer (Old Fr. )
censure
centime (Fr. )
centimetre
centipede
centralization
centre (Old Fr. )
centrifuge
centrist
cephalopod
cere
cereal
cerebral
ceremonious
cerise
certain
certainty
certificate
certify
certitude
cession
Chablis
chafe
chagrin
chain
chair, Old Fr.  "chair", compare modern Fr.  "pulpit, throne"
chaise, Fr. , from Old Fr. 
chaise longue or sometimes chaise lounge
chalet
challenge, Old Fr.
challenger, Anglo-Fr. 
chamber
chamberlain, Old Fr. , compare modern Fr. 
chambray
chameleon, Old Fr. , from Latin , from Greek 
chamfer
chamois
champagne
champaign
champertous
champignon
champion
chance
chancel
chancellor
chancery
chancre
chandelier
chandler
chandlery
change
changeable
channel
chanson
chant
chanteuse
chanterelle
chanticleer
chantilly cream
chapeau
chapel
chaperon
chaplain
chaplet
chapter
charabanc
character, Old Fr. 
charade
charcuterie
chard
Chardonnay
charette
charge
chargé d'affaires
chariot
charitable
charity
charlatan
Charles, Fr. , from Medieval Latin , from Middle High Germanic 
charlotte
charm
charnel
chart
charter
chartreuse
chase, Old Fr. , compare modern Fr. 
chaser
chassé
chasseur
chassis
chaste
chasten
chastise
chastity
chasuble
château
chateaubriand
chatelaine
chattel
chauffeur
chauvinism
cheat, Old Fr. 
check, Old Fr. 
checker, Old Fr. 
checkmate, Old Fr. , from Persian , compare modern Fr. 
cheer (Old Fr. )
chef, Fr. 
chemise
chemist, Fr. 
chenille
cheque
cherish (Old Fr. )
cherry, Anglo-Fr. and Old N. Fr. , compare Old Fr. and modern Fr. 
chess, Old Fr. 
chestnut
cheval de frise
cheval glass
chevalier
chevauchée
chevron
Cheyenne, Fr. , from Dakota 
chez
chic
chicane
chicanery
chichi
chickpea
chicory
chief, Old Fr. , compare modern Fr. 
chieftain, Old Fr. , compare modern Fr.  (only the feminine form remains)
chiffon
chiffonade
chiffonier
chignon
chimera
chimney
chiromancy
chisel
chitin
chivalrous
chivalry
chive
chloroform
chlorophyll
chock
choice
choir
choler
choleric
cholesterol
choreography
chowder
Christianity
chrome
chromium
chronic
chronicle
chute
cider
cigarette
cinema, Fr. 
cinematic
cinematography
cinnabar
cinnamon
cinquain
circle
circlet
circuit
circular
circulation
circulatory
circumcise
circumspection
circumstance
cirque
cistern
citadel
citation
cite
citizen
citron
citronella
city, Old Fr. , compare modern Fr. 
civet
civil
civilian
civilisation
civilize
claim (Old Fr. )
clairvoyance
clamor
clamorous
claque
claret
clarification
clarify
clarinet, compare 
clarion
clarity
class
classic
classify
clause
clavicle
clavier
clear
clechy
clef
clement
clementine
clergy
cliché
client
clientele
climate
clinic
clinician
clique
cloak
cloche
clock
cloisonne
cloister
close
closet, from Old French 
closure
cloture
clyster
coach
coagulation
coalition
coast
coat
coat of arms
cocaine
cochineal
cock
cockade
Cockaigne, Old Fr. , compare modern Fr. 
cockatrice
cockle
cocoon
cocotte
coddle
code
codeine
codicil
coefficient
coercion
Coeur d'Alene
coffer
coffin
cogent
cogitation
cogitative
cognac
cognisance
cohabitation
coherence
coherent
cohesion
cohort
coif
coiffeur
coiffeuse
coiffure
coil
coin, Old Fr. 
coinage
coincide
coincidence
coincident
Cointreau
collaboration
collage
collagen
collar, Old Fr. 
collateral
collation
colleague
collect
collection
collective
collector
college
collegial
collet
collision
colloid
collusion
cologne
colonel, Middle Fr. ,  compare modern Fr. 
colonnade
colossal
colour or color
colouration or coloration
columbine
column
combat
combatant
combination
combine
combust
combustible
combustion
comedian and comedienne, compare  and 
comedy
comestible
comet
comfit
comfiture
comfort
comfortable
comforter
comity
command
commandant
commander
commandment
comme il faut
commemoration
commence
commencement
commendable
commendation
commensal
comment
commentary
commerce
commercial
commiseration
commissariat
commission
commissioner
commode
commodity
common
commotion
communal
commune
communicable
communication
communicative
communion
communiqué
communism (Fr. )
communist
community, Old Fr. , modern Fr. 
commutation
compact
compaction
companion
company, Old Fr. 
comparable
comparative
compare
comparison
compartment
compass
compassion
compatible
compatriot
compeer
compel
compendious
compensable
compensation
compensatory
compere
compete
competence
competent
competitor
compilation
compile
compiler
complain
complainant
complaint
complaisance
complaisant
complement
complete
complex
complexion
complication
complicity
compliment, Fr. 
compline
comply
comport
comportment
compose
composite
composition
compost
compote
compound
comprehension
comprehensive
compress
compression
comprise
compromise
compulsion
compulsive
compunction
computation
compute
comrade, Fr. 
concave
concavity
conceal
concealment
concede
conceive
concentric
concept
conception
concern
concert
concession
concessionaire
concierge
conciliation
concision
conclusion
conclusive
concomitance
concord
concordance
concordant
concordat
concourse
concretion
concubinage
concubine
concurrence
concurrent
condemn
condense
condescend
condescendence
condign
condiment
condition
conditional
conduction
conductor
conduit
condyle
cone
coney
confection
confederacy
confederation
confer
conference
confess
confession
confessional
confidant
confidante
confidence
confident
confine
confinement
confirm
confirmation
confiscation
confit
conflagration
confluent
conform
conformity
confound
confraternity
confrere
confront
confrontation
confusion
confute
congeal
congee
congener
congestion
congratulation
congregation
congruity
conjecture
conjoin
conjoint
conjugal
conjunction
conjuncture
conjuration
conjure
conjurer
connect
connection
connoisseur, Old Fr. , compare modern Fr. 
conquer
conqueror
conquest
consanguine
consanguinity
conscience
conscientious
conscription
consecutive
consent
consequence
consequent
conservation
conservative
conservator
conserve
consider
consideration
consign
consist
consistence
consistory
consolation
console
consommé
consonance
consonant
consort
conspiracy
conspirator
conspire
constable
constance
constant
constellation
consternation
constitution
constrain
constraint
construction
constructive
consuetude
consul
consult
consultation
consume
consumption
contagion
contagious
contain
contaminate
contemn
contemplation
contemplative
contend
content
contention
contentious
contentment
contest
contestant
contiguity
continence
continent
contingent
continual
continuance
continuation
continue
continuity
contortion
contour
contra dance
contraband
contract
contractile
contraction
contracture
contradiction
contrariety
contrary
contrast
contravene
contravention
contretemps
contribution
contributor
contrite
contrition
contrive
control
controller
controverse
controversy
contumelious
contumely
contusion
convalescence
convalescent
convenance
convene
convenient
convent, Old Fr. , compare modern Fr. 
convention
conversant
conversation
converse
conversion
convert
convertible
convex
convey, Anglo-Fr. , from Old Fr. , compare modern Fr. 
convive
convivial
convocation
convoke
convoy
convulsive
cooperation
coordination
cope
coppice
coprolalia
copulation
copy
coquet
coquetry
coquette
coral
corbel
cord
cordage
cordial
cordon
cordwainer
core
coriander
Coriolis force
corm
cormorant, Old Fr. , compare Mod. Fr. 
corn [callus on the foot]
cornelian, Old Fr. , compare Mod. Fr. 
corner
cornet
corniche
coronal
coroner
coronet
corporal (n.) Middle Fr. , from  Italian , compare Mod. Fr. 
corporal (adj.) Old Fr. , compare Mod. Fr. 
corps
corpse
corpulence
corpulent
correct
correction
corrective
correlation
correspond
corridor, Fr. , from Italian 
corrigible
corrode
corrosion
corrosive
corrupt, Old Fr. 
corruptible
corsage
corsair
corset
cortege
corvee
corvette
cost
costal
costive
costume
coterie
cotillion
cottage
cotton, Old Fr. 
couch
cougar
coulee
coulomb
council
counsel
counsellor
count (v.), Old Fr. , from Latin , compare Mod. Fr. 
count (n.), Old Fr. , from Latin , compare Mod. Fr. 
countenance
counter
counteract
counterargument, counter+argument, compare 
counterattack, counter+attack, compare 
counterbalance, counter+balance, compare 
counterculture, counter+culture,compare 
counterfeit, Old Fr. 
counterintelligence, counter+intelligence, compare 
countermand, Old Fr. 
counteroffer, counter+offer, compare 
counterpart, Middle Fr. 
counterpoint
counterpoise, Old Fr. , compare Mod. Fr. 
countersign, Middle Fr. 
countervail, Anglo-Fr. , from Old Fr. 
countess
country, Old Fr. , compare Mod. Fr. 
county, Anglo-Fr. , compare 
coup
coup d'état
coup de grâce
coupe
couple
couplet
coupon
courage, Old Fr. , compare Mod. Fr. 
courageous
courant
courgette
courier
course
courser
court
court martial, Fr. 
courteous
courtesan
courtesy
courtier
couscous, Fr. , from Arabic 
cousin, Old Fr. 
couture
couturier
covenant
cover, Old Fr. 
coverlet
covert
coverture
covet
covetous
covey
coward
cowardice
coy
cramp
crap
crappie
craps [game]
crass
cravat
crayfish, Old Fr. , compare Mod. Fr. 
crayon
cream
creamery
creation
creator
creature
creche
credit
creditor
credulity
Cree
crème
crème brûlée
crème caramel
crème de la crème
crème de menthe
crenel
crenelate
creole
crêpe
creperie
crepuscule
crescent
crest
cretin
cretonne
crevasse
crevice
crew
cricket, Old Fr. 
crime
criminal
criminality
crinoline
critic
critique
Cro Magnon
crochet
crocket
crocodile
croissant
crone
croquet
croquette
crotch
crotchet
crouch
croupier
crouton, from the diminutive form of the old French word , (later to come into modern French as the word ), meaning 'crust'.
crown, Anglo-Fr. , from Old Fr. , compare Mod. Fr. 
crozier
cru
crucial
crucifix
crucify
crudités
crudity
cruel
cruelty
cruet
crusade
crusader
crush
crust, Old Fr. , compare Mod. Fr. 
cry, Old Fr. 
crystal
crystalline
cube
cubic
cubism
cuckold
cuckoo
cucumber
cuirass
cuisine
cul-de-sac
cull
culmination
culotte
culpable
culprit
cult, Fr. 
cultivation
culture, Fr. 
cuneiform
cupidity
curable
curation
curative
curb
cure
curette
curfew, Old Fr. , compare Mod. Fr. 
curie
curiosity
curious
curlew
currant
current
currier
curry (v.)
curry favor
cursive
cursory
curtail
curtain
curtilage
cushion
custard
custom, from Old Fr. , compare modern Fr. 
cutlass
cutler
cutlery
cutlet
cyclic
cygnet
cylinder
cymbal
cynosure
cypress
cystic
cystocele

See also 

 Influence of French on English
 French phrases used by English speakers
 Law French
 Glossary of fencing, (predominantly from French).
 Glossary of ballet (predominantly from French)
 Lists of English loanwords by country or language of origin
 List of English words of Gaulish origin
 List of English words of Latin origin
 List of English Latinates of Germanic origin
 Latin influence in English
 List of French words of Germanic origin
 List of French words of Gaulish origin
 List of French words of Arabic origin

References

External links
Oxford English Dictionary
Dictionary.com
Online Etymology Dictionary
Centre National de Ressources Textuelles et Lexicales 

French